Lyon is the surname of:

 A. Laurence Lyon (1934–2006), US music composer
 Alexander Lyon (disambiguation), any of several men with the name
 Alastair Lyon (born 1979), South African rugby player
 Arthur Lyon (disambiguation), any of several men with the name
 Asa Lyon (1763–1841), US politician
 Babe Lyon (1907–1970), US football player
 Barbara Lyon (1931–1995), US-born singer who lived and worked mostly in England
 Barrett Lyon (born 1978), US computer entrepreneur
 Ben Lyon (1901–1979), US film actor
 Beverley Lyon (1902–1970), British cricketer
 Bill Lyon (1886–1962), Australian football player
 Billy Lyon (born 1973), US football player
 Bob Lyon, US politician
 Brandon Lyon (born 1979), American baseball pitcher
 Bruce Lyon, US film producer
 Caleb Lyon (1822–1875), US politician (Governor of Idaho Territory)
 Charles Lyon (1878–1959), British cricketer
 Charles W. Lyon (1887–1960), US politician
 Chittenden Lyon (1787–1842), US politician
 Christopher Lyon, US political worker
 Daniel Lyon (born 1980), US wrestler (professional name Super Dragon)
 Danny Lyon (born 1942), US photographer and filmmaker
 David Lyon (disambiguation), any of several men with the name
 David Murray-Lyon (1890–1975), officer in the Indian Army
 Dar Lyon (1898–1964), English cricketer
 Duffy Lyon (1929–2011), American farmer and butter sculptor
 Edward E. Lyon (1871–1931), US soldier and war hero
 Elinor Lyon (1921–2008), English author
 Francis D. Lyon (1905–1996), American film editor
 Francis Strother Lyon (1800–1882), American and Confederate States politician
 Frank Lyon (1867–1955), American lawyer, newspaper publisher and land developer
 Fred Lyon (1924–2022), American photographer
 Frederick A. Lyon (1843–1911), US soldier in the Union Army during the US Civil War, war hero
 Gail Lyon, US filmmaker
 Garry Lyon (born 1967), Australian rules footballer
 George Lyon (disambiguation), any of several men with the name
 Gordon Lyon (born 1977), computer expert
 Guy J. Lyon (1933–2001), US horse trainer
 Harris Merton Lyon (1882–1916), US author
 Harry Lyon (disambiguation), any of several men with the name
 Hart Lyon (1721–1800), Chief Rabbi of the United Kingdom
 Homer L. Lyon (1879–1956), US politician
 Howard Lyon, American artist
 Hylan B. Lyon (1836–1907), Confederate General in the US Civil War
 Ivan Lyon (1915–1944), British soldier and war hero
 James Lyon (disambiguation), any of several men with the name
 Jamie Lyon (born 1982), Australian rugby league player
 Jason Lyon (born 1986), Canadian archer
 Jean Lyon, Countess of Strathmore and Kinghorne (1713–1778), British noblewoman
 Jennifer Lyon (1972–2010), US television actress
 Jimmy Lyon (born 1955), US rock musician
 Jo Anne Lyon (born 1940), US religious figure
 John Lyon (disambiguation), any of several men with the name
 Joshua Lyon (born 1974), US author
 Juliet Lyon, director of Prison Reform Trust
 Leo De Lyon (born 1926), US voice actor
 Lisa Lyon (born 1953), US bodybuilder
 Lucius Lyon (1800–1851), US politician
 Lyon sisters (Katherine Mary Lyon, age 10, and Sheila Mary Lyon, age 12), who vanished without a trace from a suburban Maryland shopping mall in 1975
 Marcus Ward Lyon, Jr. (1875–1942), American mammalogist, bacteriologist, and pathologist
 Mary Lyon (1797–1849), US pioneer in women's education
 Mary Lyon (writer), US author
 Mary F. Lyon (1925–2014), English geneticist
 Matthew Lyon (1749–1822), US politician
 Myer Lyon (1750–1797), German-born English singer
 Nathan Lyon (chef), US television personality and chef
 Nathan Lyon (cricketer) (born 1987), Australian cricketer
 Nathaniel Lyon (1818–1861), US Civil War general
 Nick Lyon (born 1970), US filmmaker
 Noah Lyon (born 1979), US artist
 Patrick Lyon d'Andrimont
 Peter Lyon (born 1941), Australian football player
 Phyllis Lyon and Del Martin (1924–2020 and 1921–2008), American feminists and gay-rights activists
 Richard Lyon (disambiguation), any of several men with the name
 Rick Lyon (born 1958), US puppeteer
 Robert Lyon (disambiguation), any of several men with the name
 Rod Lyon, British radio personality
 Ross Lyon (born 1966), Australian football player and coach
 Russ Lyon (1913–1975), US baseball player
 Sam Lyon (1890–1916), English footballer
 Sterling Lyon (1927–2010), Premier of Manitoba from 1977 to 1981
 Steve Lyon (born 1952), Canadian hockey player
 Sue Lyon, (1946–2019), US actress
 T. Edgar Lyon (1903–1978), US scholar
 Thomas Lyon (disambiguation), any of several men with the name
 Tom Lyon, British escape artist
 Waldo K. Lyon (1914–1998), US naval scientist
 Walter Lyon (poet) (1887–1915), British war poet
 Walter Lyon (cricketer) (1841–1918), English cricketer
 Walter Lyon (Pennsylvania politician) (1853–1933), US politician
 William Lyon (film editor) (1903–1974), US film editor
 William Lyon (bishop) (died 1617), British cleric
 William Lyon (general) (1923-2020), US Air Force Major General
 William C. Lyon (1841–1908), US politician (Governor of Ohio 1888-1890)
 William Durie Lyon (1825–1893), Canadian politician
 William P. Lyon (1822–1913), US politician

See also
 Lyons (surname) 

English-language surnames
Surnames from nicknames